Meroitic may refer to:

 things related to the city and kingdom of Meroë in pre-Islamic Sudan
 Meroitic alphabet
 Meroitic language

Language and nationality disambiguation pages